Inclán Sport Club (sometimes referred as Inclán Sport) is a Peruvian football club, playing in the city of Mollendo, Arequipa, Peru.

History
The Inclán Sport Club was founded on July 27, 1919.

In 2011 Copa Perú, the club classified to the Departamental Stage, but was eliminated by Deportivo Estrella in the Second Stage.

In 2016 Copa Perú, the club classified to the Departamental Stage, but was eliminated by Binacional in the First Stage.

In 2017 Copa Perú, the club classified to the Departamental Stage, but was eliminated by Cerrito Los Libres in the First Stage.

Honours

Regional
Liga Departamental de Arequipa:
Winners (1): 1991

Liga Provincial de Islay:
Winners (4): 1991, 1999, 2000, 2011
Runner-up (2): 2016, 2017

Liga Distrital de Mollendo:
Winners (9): 1974, 1979, 1991, 1999, 2001, 2004, 2011, 2016, 2017
Runner-up (4): 2010, 2013, 2015, 2022

See also
List of football clubs in Peru
Peruvian football league system

References

External links
 Galería

Football clubs in Peru
Association football clubs established in 1919
1919 establishments in Peru